Amini Park is a cricket ground in Port Moresby, Papua New Guinea. Part of the Bisini Parade sports complex in the suburb of Boroko, it is the headquarters of Cricket PNG.

History
The ground was established in 1956 and named Amini Park in 1983 after the Amini family, several of whom have played cricket and other sports for Papua New Guinea (both the men's and women's teams).

The ground has seen the men's team play Australia, the West Indies and Victoria. The women's team played Japan in a three-match series at the ground in September 2006.

In May 2016, the ground hosted its first List A match when Papua New Guinea defeated Kenya in the 2015–17 ICC World Cricket League Championship.  In October 2016, the ground hosted its first first-class match when Papua New Guinea defeated Namibia in the 2015–17 ICC Intercontinental Cup. The ground hosted the Regional Finals of the 2018–19 ICC World Twenty20 East Asia-Pacific Qualifier tournament in March 2019.

International record

One Day International centuries 
One ODI century has been scored at the venue.

Twenty20 International centuries 
One T20I century has been scored at the venue.

References

External links
Amini Park, Port Moresby at CricketArchive

Cricket grounds in Papua New Guinea
Buildings and structures in Port Moresby
Cricket in Papua New Guinea
Papua New Guinea in international cricket
Sports venues completed in 1971